The Hutterite Christian Communities are an affiliation of independent Hutterite colonies that work closely together and also have their preachers delivering sermons in the other colonies of this affiliation. Currently there are five colonies:
 Altona Christian Community in Henderson, Minnesota, United States (independent since 2005) 
 Detention River Christian Community, formerly known as Rocky Cape Christian Community, on the Australian island of Tasmania (since 2005)
 Elmendorf Christian Community in Mountain Lake, Minnesota (founded in 1994, independent since 2005)
 Fort Pitt Farms Christian Community in Frenchman Butte, Saskatchewan, Canada (independent since 1999) 
 Grand River Christian Community in Jamesport, Missouri, United States (since 2014)

Population 
These communities have about 525 people living there, mostly ethnic Hutterites, but there is one person of  Russian Mennonite background, as well as a few people from other Christian backgrounds.

See also 
 Caneyville Christian Community
 Christian Communities (Elmo Stoll)
 Believers in Christ, Lobelville
 Michigan Amish Churches

References 

Anabaptism
Hutterite communities
Hutterites